Streptomyces manganisoli is a bacterium species from the genus of Streptomyces which has been isolated from soil near the Xiangtan Manganese Mine in China.

See also 
 List of Streptomyces species

References 

manganisoli
Bacteria described in 2018